Events from the year 1767 in Canada.

Incumbents
Monarch: George III

Governors
Governor of the Province of Quebec: James Murray
Governor of Nova Scotia: Montague Wilmot
Commodore-Governor of Newfoundland: Hugh Palliser

Events
 A second Fort Dauphin was built on the north shore of Lake Dauphin.

Births
May 19 – Sir George Prevost (died 1816)

Deaths

Historical documents
Lt. Gov. Guy Carleton's assessment of loyalty and potential opposition that Quebec government should anticipate, and need for defence build-up

Hopefully "representations" of Quebec justices visiting London will spur Parliament to "put a stop to that spirit of controversy so hurtful to the publick weal"

Carleton says replace September 17, 1764 ordinance with old Canadian laws, then "advisable Alterations" such as salaries instead of fees for officials

In case troubles in America develop into war, Carleton argues for strengthened lines of communication between Quebec City and New York City

More than three dozen "Principal People of Montreal" petition for right of all Quebec subjects, no matter their religion, to seek any public office

Under death sentence for robbery, Simon La Pointe is pardoned because he is first of "His Majesty's new Subjects" to be convicted of capital crime

"To Be Sold, A Healthy Negro Boy, about 15 Years of Age, well qualified to wait on a Gentleman as a Body Servant"

Montreal vintner seeks missing "Mulatto Negro Slave" who "is supposed to have with him forged Certificates of his Freedom, and Passes;" $8 reward

"Her Master" seeks missing indentured servant woman "inticed away by two dischar'd Soldiers;" $5 reward for capture of each

Quebec's cash scarcity can be remedied by increasing and improving production of food, textiles and ships, and relying less on fisheries and fur trade

Notice supports midwife Susanna Furth against her detractors, as her professionalism saved subscriber's wife when her child was stillborn

Despite recurrent chimney fires and purchase in 1765 of two large fire engines, no fire regulations have been established in Quebec City

Collector of "the Seeds of all the Trees, Shrubs and Flowers, which grow in Canada" (400 species over 3 years) will supply same to "the Curious"

Unmarried men scolded in prose and poetry for their "dull stupid sauntring Life" and "sad self" (followed by counter-argument in "Marriage A-La-Mode")

Husband wishes to receive fewer invitations to social events as spending $2–3 a week "does not tally with my Income;" his wife calls him dull

Nova Scotia Assembly reports to governor that province, under its "present embarrassed Circumstances," cannot cover government expenses

"Officers of Government having voluntarily proposed a Reduction of the Salaries," Gov. Campbell to issue interest-bearing warrants for expenses

Nova Scotia townships census records 13,214 whites, 104 free Blacks and 28 Indigenous people

"Numbers of People had their Chance" - Lots drawn in London for property on St. John's Island, which comprises 1.5 million acres

With Canadian and British fur traders against French from Mississippi, France will gain, Britain lose and Quebec be ruined by tight British regulations

Trader Alexander Henry the elder relates aspects of Cree culture, including Nanaboujou's legend and grave on Michipicoten Bay, Lake Superior

Two young Inuit at Prince of Wales Fort on Hudson Bay to learn English and "Southern Indian" languages, nurturing peace between native peoples

References

 
Canada
67